James Rogers or Rodgers may refer to:

Music
James Hotchkiss Rogers (1857–1940), American organist, composer, teacher, music critic, and publisher
Jimmy Rogers (1924–1997), blues guitarist
Jimmy Rogers (album), 1990
Jimmie Rodgers (1897–1933), known as the "Singing Brakeman"
Jimmie Rodgers (pop singer) (1933–2021), sang "Honeycomb"
Gamble Rogers (James Gamble Rogers IV, 1937–1991), American folk musician

Sports

American football
James O. Rodgers (American football) (1874–1945), American football player and coach
Jimmy Rogers (American football) (born 1955), American NFL football running back with the New Orleans Saints
Jimmy Rogers (American football coach) (born 1988/1989), American football coach
James Rogers (American football) (born 1988), American NFL football cornerback with the Tampa Bay Buccaneers and Kansas City Chiefs
James Rodgers (gridiron football) (born 1988), American NFL football wide receiver with the Atlanta Falcons

Other sports
Jim Rogers (baseball) (1872–1900), American baseball player
Jimmy Rodgers (footballer) (1897–1973), Australian rules footballer
Jimmy Rogers (footballer) (1929–1996), English footballer
Jimmy Rodgers (basketball) (born 1943), American basketball coach and executive
James Rogers (handballer) (born 1946), American Olympic handball player
Jimmy Rogers (basketball) (born 1950s), American basketball player
James Rogers (cricketer) (born 1958), English cricketer
Jimmy Rogers (baseball) (born 1967), American baseball player

Politics
James Rogers (congressman) (1795–1873), U.S. Representative from South Carolina
James Grafton Rogers (1883–1971), Assistant Secretary of State
James T. Rogers (1864–1929), New York politician
James Woodall Rodgers (1890–1961), American attorney, businessman and mayor of Dallas
Jim Rogers (California politician) (born 1955), city councilman and "the Peoples' Lawyer" in Richmond, California
Jim Rodgers (politician), former Lord Mayor of Belfast, Northern Ireland

Religion
James Rogers (bishop) (1826–1902), Canadian Roman Catholic bishop
James Guinness Rogers (1822–1911), British Nonconformist clergyman

Military
James Rogers (Australian soldier) (1875–1961), Australian soldier who received the Victoria Cross
James Rogers (British Army officer) (1726–1790), colonial American soldier and Loyalist

Academics
James Blythe Rogers (1802–1852), United States chemist
James E. Rogers (attorney) (1938–2014), interim chancellor of the Nevada System of Higher Education
 James Edwin Thorold Rogers (1823–1890), English economist, historian and Liberal politician
James Harvey Rogers (1886–1939), professor of economics
Leonard James Rogers (1862–1933), British mathematician

Businessmen
Jim Rogers (born 1942), co-founder of the Quantum Fund
James D. Rogers (born 1949), president and CEO of Kampgrounds of America
James E. Rogers Jr. (1947–2018), American businessman and author
James Woodall Rodgers (1890–1961), American attorney, businessman and mayor of Dallas

Other
J. B. Rogers, American film director and producer
James Edward Rogers (1838–1896), Irish architect and artist 
James Gamble Rogers (1867–1947), American architect
James Gamble Rogers II (1901–1990), American architect
James W. Rodgers (1910–1960), American criminal executed by firing squad in Utah
Jimmie Rodgers (Pacific Community), Director General of Secretariat of the Pacific Community in Nouméa, New Caledonia
James O. Rodgers (author), American writer and proponent of diverse workplaces
James Rodgers (consul) (1861–1930), United States Consul-General to Shanghai, Havana and Montreal
James Rogers, the son of Captain America and Black Widow from Marvel Animation's Next Avengers (2008)

Rogers, James